Spice Islander I was a  Ro-Ro ferry which was built in Greece in 1967 as Marianna. She was renamed Apostolos P following a sale in 1988. She was sold to a Honduran company in 2007 and renamed Spice Islander I. On 10 September 2011, she sank resulting in the deaths of 1,573 people; many of whom were never recovered.

Description

History
Built in 1967 as Marianna for an unknown owner, she was later sold to Theologos P. Naftiliaki of Piraeus, Greece. In 1988, Marianna was sold to Apostolos Shipping and renamed Apostolos P. She was later sold to Saronikos Ferries and placed in service on the Piraeus – Aegina – Agistri route.

In 2005, Apostolos P was registered to Hellenic Seaways. In 2007, she was sold to Makame Hasnuu of Zanzibar, Tanzania, and renamed Spice Islander I.

On 25 September 2007, Spice Islander I was off the coast of Somalia when she experienced engine problems due to contaminated fuel. After the alarm had been raised via Kenya,  from Combined Task Force 150 was sent to her aid. The ship was on a voyage from Oman to Tanzania and was not carrying any passengers.  also responded. After her engines were restarted, she resumed her voyage to Tanzania.

Loss

At 21:00 local time (19:00 UTC) on 9 September 2011, Spice Islander I set sail from Unguja for Pemba Island. She was reported to have been carrying an excess of 800 passengers. Her capacity was 45 crew and 654 passengers. At around 01:00, (local time) on 10 September (23:00, 9 September UTC) Spice Islander I sank between Zanzibar and Pemba. Of those on board, 620 were rescued. Only 240 bodies were recovered, and the death toll was placed at 2,976; however this estimate was revised downward in January 2012 to 1,573.

References

External links
Ethical engineering analysis of passenger ship accidents in Zanzibar – Webb Institute
 Report on Maritime Accidents – Swedish Maritime Administration

1967 ships
Ships built in Greece
Merchant ships of Greece
Merchant ships of Tanzania
Shipwrecks in the Indian Ocean